Troy Castaneda (born November 15, 1989) is an American racing driver from Sacramento, California.

After karting from 2004 to 2006, Castaneda competed in the Formula Russell series in 2007 and the Italian Formula Master Championship in 2008. In 2009 he returned to karting, winning the US Rotax Nationals points championship and finishing second in the national championship event. He also competed in the Rotax World Finals where he finished fifth.

Castaneda made his professional racing debut with Bryan Herta Autosport on the Streets of St. Petersburg in the Firestone Indy Lights series in March 2012. He had previously tested in the fall of 2011 at the Indianapolis Motor Speedway with the team. Castaneda finished ninth in his debut at St. Pete but crashed out of the race due to a mechanical failure in his second start at Barber Motorsports Park. He was replaced in the BHA car by Nick Andries for the third race of the season in Long Beach.

Castaneda is also an International model and actor.  He is currently represented by ICONS in South Africa, Wilhelmina Hawaii, STARS in San Francisco, Dreamodels in Hong Kong and MSA Models in Los Angeles.  He is represented theatrically with Ayers Talent Agency and with Osbrink commercially.

References

External links

1989 births
Racing drivers from Sacramento, California
Indy Lights drivers
Living people

Bryan Herta Autosport drivers